John Edward Newton (April 4, 1904 – March 25, 1984) was a justice of the Nebraska Supreme Court, appointed to fill a vacancy on the court in 1967 and serving until his retirement in 1971.

Born in Ponca, Nebraska, Newton graduated from Ponca High School and received his law degree from the University of Nebraska College of Law.

On July 12, 1940, Newton married Bonnie May Brownlee, with whom he had a son and a daughter. He died at his home in Ponca at the age of 79.

References

1904 births
1984 deaths
People from Ponca, Nebraska
University of Nebraska College of Law alumni
Justices of the Nebraska Supreme Court